Jens Berthel Askou (born 19 August 1982) is a Danish football coach and former professional player. He is in charge of AC Horsens.

Askou has played for a number of Danish clubs before moving abroad, first to Turkish club Kasımpaşa and then to Norwich City in England, before moving back to Denmark to play for Vejle BK. in August 2013 he signed a two-year contract with Esbjerg.

Club career
Born in Videbæk, Askou began his career at Ikast FS before moving to Holstebro Boldklub in 2002. His performances led to a contract with 1st Division Silkeborg IF in the summer of 2003, following a successful trial. He helped the club regain promotion to the Danish Superliga during his first season, and became a regular for four years. In 2007, Askou failed to agree a new deal with SIF, which led to a move to Turkish football with Kasımpaşa.

Kasımpaşa finished bottom of the 2007–08 Süper Lig, with Askou appearing frequently and scoring twice. However, despite Askou's own goal in the playoffs semi-final, the club returned to the top flight at the first attempt in 2008–09. His contract was not renewed the following summer.

Norwich City
In July 2009, Askou linked up with English League One club Norwich City on their pre-season tour of Scotland. He impressed suitably with his defensive displays in the club's friendly matches, also managing to score with a header against Airdrie United. Then manager Bryan Gunn confirmed on 27 July he had offered Askou a contract. It was revealed on 30 July that Askou had signed a two-year deal with Norwich. He made his debut in a 4–0 win over Yeovil Town in the League Cup on 11 August, helping to keep a clean sheet. Four days later, he scored on his league debut as Norwich drew 1–1 with Exeter City. Askou became a regular starter for Norwich until picking up a metatarsal injury in a league game against Yeovil in December, which kept him out until May 2010.

He scored a header against Blackburn Rovers in the League Cup in August 2010; a game which Norwich lost 3–1. Askou's opportunities at Norwich were limited in the 2010–11 season, making only two Championship starts in the first half of the campaign.

In January 2011, Askou moved to fellow Championship side Millwall on a one-month loan. He was sent off on his debut against Leicester City for a two-footed lunge on Yakubu. This was his only appearance for the club and he returned to Norwich in February. He did not appear again for his parent club either and was released by the club at the end of the season after his contract expired.

Vejle Boldklub Kolding
Askou signed a two-year contract with Danish first division team Vejle Boldklub Kolding in August 2011. During his time a Vejle, he scored six goals in 55 appearances and was appointed club captain in the summer of 2012.

Askou signed a two-year deal with Esbjerg in the Danish Superliga On 2 August 2013 for an undisclosed fee.

Coaching and later career
In 2015 Askou became playing assistant manager at Skive IK. A year later he took up the same position at Thisted FC.

In June 2017 Askou became Erik Rasmussen's assistant manager at Vendsyssel FF. On 8 May 2018 Rasmussen resigned as manager and was replaced by Askou. After an overall defeat against AC Horsens in the Danish Superliga relegation play off games, Askou and his staff was fired on 20 May 2019.

In October 2019, Askou signed with Denmark Series 4 amateur club TIF All Stars.

In the beginning of November 2019 it was confirmed, that Askou would become the manager of HB Thorshavn in the Faroe Islands starting from 1 December 2019. One year later, on 5 December 2020, he had won the double with HB Tórshavn by first winning the Faroe Islands Premier League and then the Faroe Islands Cup. He also won the honour as the best football manager 2020 in the Faroe Islands, chosen by the Venjarafelag Føroya (Faroese Association of Football Managers).

In January 2021 he left Tórshavn to become new manager of struggling Danish Superliga club AC Horsens.

Personal life
Askou is married to Rikke. The couple have three children – Julius, Cornelius and Augusta.  Julius and Cornelius attend the International School Ikast-Brande in Ikast, Denmark.

Managerial statistics

Honours

Player
Silkeborg IF
Danish 1st Division: 2003–04

Kasımpaşa
TFF 1. League Playoffs Winners: 2008–09

Norwich City
League One: 2009–10
Championship runners-up: 2010–11

Manager
Havnar Bóltfelag
 Faroe Islands Premier League: 2020
 Faroe Islands Cup: 2020
 Won the Double in Faroese football: 2020

Individual
Faroe Islands Premier League Manager of the Year: 2020

References

 Topscorer og assistent forlader Skive, bold.dk, 31 May 2016

External links

 
 Jens Berthel Askou Superliga statistics by Danish Football Association
 
 Jens Berthel Askou player profile at canaries.co.uk
 

Living people
1982 births
People from Ringkøbing-Skjern Municipality
Association football defenders
Danish men's footballers
Danish football managers
Ikast FS players
Holstebro BK players
Silkeborg IF players
Kasımpaşa S.K. footballers
Norwich City F.C. players
Millwall F.C. players
Vejle Boldklub Kolding players
Esbjerg fB players
Danish Superliga players
Danish 1st Division players
Süper Lig players
English Football League players
Danish expatriate men's footballers
Danish expatriate sportspeople in Turkey
Expatriate footballers in Turkey
Danish expatriate sportspeople in England
Expatriate footballers in England
Vendsyssel FF managers
Havnar Bóltfelag managers
AC Horsens managers
Danish 1st Division managers
Sportspeople from the Central Denmark Region